WLKJ is a radio station in Johnstown, Pennsylvania, located at 105.7 MHz. WLKJ broadcasts the K-LOVE Network, and is owned by EMF Broadcasting.

History
For many years, this station was known as WZGO, and had broadcast a country music format for much of its existence, including a simulcast of WFGY in Altoona for many years. It had been the FM sister station to AM 1470 in Portage, but maintained separate studios and offices in downtown Johnstown.

See also
Other K-LOVE stations in Pennsylvania include:
 WKPA, State College, PA
 WKVP, Philadelphia, PA
 WLKE, Altoona, PA
 WLKA, Scranton, PA
 WPKV, Pittsburgh, PA
 W269AS, Harrisburg, PA

External links
 

K-Love radio stations
Radio stations established in 1992
1992 establishments in Pennsylvania
Educational Media Foundation radio stations
LKJ